The 1951 County Championship was the 52nd officially organised running of the County Championship, and ran from 5 May to 4 September 1951. Warwickshire County Cricket Club claimed their second title.

Table
12 points for a win
6 points to each side in a match in which scores finish level
4 points for first innings lead in a lost or drawn match
2 points for tie on first innings in a lost or drawn match
Note: Pld = Played, W = Wins, L = Losses, LWF = Lost but won on 1st innings, DWF = Won on 1st innings in drawn match, DTF = Tied on 1st innings in drawn match, DLF = Lost on 1st innings in drawn match, ND = No Decision on 1st innings, Pts = Points, (C) = Champions.

Statistics

See also 
 1951 English cricket season

References

External links  
 County Championship, 1951 at Cricinfo

County Championship
County Championship seasons